Timon Haugan (born 27 December 1996) is a Norwegian World Cup alpine ski racer who specializes in slalom.

At the 2016 Junior World Championships, Haugan finished eleventh at best, but returned in 2017 and won the silver medal in the giant slalom.

Haugan made his World Cup debut in December 2017 in Italy at Madonna di Campiglio, and also collected his first World Cup points with a 24th-place finish.  His first podium (and first top ten) came in February 2020, as the runner-up in the slalom at Chamonix, France.

He represents the sports club Oppdal.

World Cup results

Season standings

Race podiums
 0 wins
 2 podiums (2 SL); 6 top tens (6 SL)

World Championship results

References

External links

 
 

1996 births
Living people
People from Oppdal
Norwegian male alpine skiers
Alpine skiers at the 2022 Winter Olympics
Olympic alpine skiers of Norway
Medalists at the 2022 Winter Olympics
Olympic medalists in alpine skiing
Olympic bronze medalists for Norway
Sportspeople from Trøndelag